Kotemaori  is a village and rural community located in the Wairoa District of the Hawke's Bay Region, in New Zealand's North Island. It is located between Raupunga and Putorino, to the west of Wairoa (to which it is connected by State Highway 2). The settlement itself lies immediately to the south of the highway.

The area includes steep forestry land where dogs have been regularly rescued. The settlement is surrounded on three sides by small streams which eventually flow into the Mohaka River  to the northeast of Kotemaori.

A rail line, part of the Palmerston North–Gisborne Line, lies close to the settlement, which was formerly served by Kotemaori railway station. The part of the line between Napier and Gisborne was effectively mothballed in 2012. , the line is in the process of being reopened for freight-only traffic, specifically the transportation of logs from forestry sites around Wairoa to the port at Napier.

Education
Kotemaori School is a Year 1–8 co-educational state primary school.

References

Wairoa District
Populated places in the Hawke's Bay Region